Tulki may refer to:
 Tulki, Hamadan
 Tulki, South Khorasan
 Tulki, West Azerbaijan